Cyclin-C is a protein that in humans is encoded by the CCNC gene.

The protein encoded by this gene is a member of the cyclin family of proteins. The encoded protein interacts with cyclin-dependent kinase 8 and induces the phosphorylation of the carboxy-terminal domain of the large subunit of RNA polymerase II. The level of mRNAs for this gene peaks in the G1 phase of the cell cycle. Two transcript variants encoding different isoforms have been found for this gene.

Interactions
CCNC (gene) has been shown to interact with Estrogen receptor alpha and Cyclin-dependent kinase 8.

References

External links

Further reading